Pholcophora americana is a species of cellar spider in the family Pholcidae. It is found in the United States and Canada.

References

Further reading

 

Pholcidae
Articles created by Qbugbot
Spiders described in 1896